Ab-polar current, an obsolete term sometimes found in 19th century meteorological literature, refers to any air current moving away from either the North Pole or the South Pole. In the Northern Hemisphere, this term indicates a northerly wind. The Latin prefix ab- means "from" or "away from".

Atmospheric dynamics